The women's 100 metres event at the 2004 African Championships in Athletics was held in Brazzaville, Republic of the Congo on July 14–15.

Medalists

Results

Heats
Wind:Heat 1: +1.3 m/s, Heat 2: +1.1 m/s, Heat 3: +1.9 m/s, Heat 4: +1.1 m/s

Semifinals
Wind:Heat 1: +0.1 m/s, Heat 2: +0.1 m/s

Final
Wind: +0.2 m/s

References
Results

2004 African Championships in Athletics
100 metres at the African Championships in Athletics
2004 in women's athletics